eRowz (formerly trading as BC.Net) is a vertical search engine, with a specialisation of classified advertising in sectors such as cars, product sales and real estate. The businesses strength is in its range of websites (e.g. for-sale.co.uk and for-sale.com), which provide niche country specific offerings for the sale of second hand goods via online classified advertising, reaching around reach around 7 million visits per month.

History
eRowz was founded and patented in Belgium in mid-2011 by Vincent Vandegans and Bart Verschueren. Initially commencing with a classified website in France, followed by Italy, eRowz now operates in fourteen countries globally with a portfolio of classified advertising related websites. The group of sites are published in seven different languages and receive more than seven million unique visitors each month.

How eRowz works
eRowz is a custom built search engine that currently crawls real estate, cars and product related classified advertisements to obtain unstructured data. Another source of data are frequent data feeds and API interfaces with partners such as eBay, Amazon and Kelkoo.

The data acquired is then aggregated into one giant eRowz database. This data is then presented real-time to visitors based on their preferences, settings and searches. Visitors can set-up alerts for new items for sale matching their criteria. eRowz uses geolocation technology to help the visitor find products which are closest to the place they live.

Accolades
eRowz was selected in the Tie50 International Entrepreneur in 2015. eRowz also won the Trend Awards in 2014 for its fast rate of growth. It was finalist at the Enteprize of the Year by Ernst & Young

References

Online marketplaces of Belgium